Aylsham North railway station was a station in Aylsham, Norfolk on the Midland and Great Northern Joint Railway line from the Midlands to the Norfolk coast. It was closed in 1959, along with the rest of the line. The station was demolished following its closure and is now a car park for the Weavers Way; this footpath follows the old trackbed to Yarmouth.

History

Opened by the Eastern and Midlands Railway, Aylsham North became a Midland and Great Northern Joint Railway station. During the Grouping of 1923, it converted to a joint operation of the London, Midland and Scottish Railway and the London and North Eastern Railway, with the latter taking sole operation in 1936.

The station then passed on to the Eastern Region of British Railways upon nationalisation in 1948 and was closed by the British Transport Commission, along with the rest of the line, in 1959.

The site today

The only remaining structure in the yard is the goods depot, which is visible from the road.

See also
 List of closed railway stations in Norfolk

References

External sources
 Station on navigable O.S. map

Disused railway stations in Norfolk
Former Midland and Great Northern Joint Railway stations
Railway stations in Great Britain opened in 1883
Railway stations in Great Britain closed in 1959
Aylsham